The men's 4 × 800 metres relay at the 2014 IAAF World Relays was held at the Thomas Robinson Stadium on 24 May.

At the start of this race Peter Agaba was caught napping, giving up 20 metres to the field.  Ferguson Cheruiyot made it clear it was going to be a record attempt, the Kenyan running off the front and making a clear separation from the pack.  Kevin López kicked past Michael Rutt to put Spain in second place at the handoff with a strong finish by Shaquille Dill putting Bermuda into the mix.  After Cheruiyot's 1:45.8 first leg, Kenya had a 30 metre lead.  Job Koech Kinyor took off with similar intent widening the gap to 40 metres, Aaron Evans running in second place for Bermuda.  Towards the end of the second leg, the pack bunched behind Evans, with Robby Andrews kicking past everyone to put the USA in second at the handoff.  Sammy Kibet Kirongo continued the effort, for the third consecutive leg, the Kenyans running their first lap in times tickling 50 seconds flat and suffering the second lap.  Clearly in second place, Brandon Johnson started to close down the gap.  Kibet's second lap was indeed painful, his leg ending in an exhausted standing position.  Marcin Lewandowski ran around the pack into a clear third place with 300 metres to go in his leg, the Polish team closing down on the second place Americans, still 25 metres behind the Kenyans.  World Junior Champion Alfred Kipketer ran his first lap even harder than his teammates, under 50 seconds as if he had the super human ability of his namesake Wilson, the lead again opening up to 40 metres over Duane Solomon, who had future World silver medalist Adam Kszczot on his heels.  The reality of running 800 metres came down on Kipketer, his pace slowed noticeably, his huge lead disappearing.  As Solomon gained, Kszczot was on his shoulder and running by.  Kipketer was flailing trying to will his body the final few metres to the finish.  Kipketer made it, with enough every left to hold up his hand in victory.  Kszczot was leaning for the finish but was not close enough for it to be effective, but clearly ahead of Solomon.  It was a surprisingly close finish with three teams within 2/3 of a second after Kenya had run a time trial, with a huge lead for most of the race.

Records
Prior to the competition, the records were as follows:

Schedule

Results

References

4 x 800 metres relay
4 × 800 metres relay